Christian Cook (born June 3, 1975 in Denver, Colorado) is a retired professional lacrosse defenseman who last played professional field lacrosse with the Washington Bayhawks of Major League Lacrosse (MLL). He starred as a member of the Princeton Tigers men's lacrosse team from 1995 through 1998, where he earned National Collegiate Athletic Association (NCAA) lacrosse defenseman of the year award, two United States Intercollegiate Lacrosse Association (USILA) All-American recognitions (one first team), four Ivy League championships, and three national championships.

As a professional he has been recognized as the Major League Lacrosse Defensive Player of the Year and been a member of Team USA at the World Lacrosse Championships.  He was twice named to the Major League Lacrosse All-Star Game and has been a member of an MLL Steinfeld Cup championship team.

Background
Cook was a high school All-American lacrosse player at Denver East High School.

College career 

He anchored the defense of the teams that were led on offense by the record-setting trio of revered attackmen Jesse Hubbard, Jon Hess and Chris Massey.  He was awarded the 1998 Schmeisser Award as the best NCAA lacrosse defenseman. He was a first team USILA All-American Team selection in 1998 and third team selection in 1997.  He was also first team All-Ivy League in 1997 and 1998.  The 1995 team, which earned the school's sixth consecutive NCAA Men's Lacrosse Championship invitation, was Ivy League co-champion, while the 1996–1998 teams were 6–0 undefeated outright conference champions.  These undefeated league champions won the 1996, 1997 and 1998 NCAA Division I Men's Lacrosse Championships, becoming the first team to threepeat since Syracuse from 1988–90 and the first to be recognized to have done so without an NCAA scandal since Johns Hopkins from 1978–80. He was a co-captain during his 1998 senior season. Cook was named to Princeton's All-Decade team.

In one game as a senior, he held the Ivy League's leading scorer, Mike Ferrucci of Harvard, scoreless. In the 1998 NCAA Division I Men's Lacrosse Championship tournament semifinals he held the nation's leading scorer Casey Powell of Syracuse without a goal in the 11–10 victory, but he was injured and had to sit out the finals on crutches.  He was named to the All-tournament team nonetheless.

Professional career 
Cook played with the New Jersey Pride during the 2001 through 2003 MLL seasons.  The Pride traded him to the Baltimore Bayhawks for a second round draft choice in the 2005 Collegiate Draft.  He then played with the Baltimore Bayhawks from 2004 through 2006 and stayed with the franchise when it became the Washington Bayhawks for the 2007 and 2008 seasons. Cook was part of the Bayhawks' 2005 Steinfeld Cup MLL Championship team.  He is a two-time Major League Lacrosse All-Star.

Cook missed four games of the 2006 season due to participation in the World Games.  At the 2006 World Lacrosse Championships, he was one of four Princeton athletes on Team USA.

Personal 
Cook has worked for the United States Secret Service, American Enterprise Institute and PricewaterhouseCoopers.  He competed in the AAU Junior Olympic Games in skiing in 1990.  Cook was named to the Colorado Lacrosse Hall of Fame in 2003.  His sister, Lauren, played lacrosse at Davidson College in Charlotte, North Carolina.  He is the son of Gary and Diane Cook. He earned his Bachelor of Arts in Politics from Princeton University and his Master of Business Administration from Georgetown University. Christian and Lauren have founded Play for Parkinson's Lacrosse after their mother was diagnosed with early stage Parkinson's disease.

References

External links
 Washington Bayhawks Player Bio
 Washington Bayhawks Official Website
 US Lacrosse Men's Team Bio
 Christian Cook Highlight Video

1975 births
American lacrosse players
McDonough School of Business alumni
Lacrosse defenders
Living people
Major League Lacrosse players
Major League Lacrosse major award winners
New Jersey Pride players
Princeton Tigers men's lacrosse players
Chesapeake Bayhawks players